Rudolf Bailovic (born 1885 in Sarajevo) was a Serbo-Croatian interpreter and cryptographer, of Austrian descent, who was head of the Balkan Referat of General der Nachrichtenaufklärung during World War II. Bailovic held the civil service rank of  civil servant and was promoted to senior civil servant or Oberregierungsrat in 1944. Bailovic was considered an anti-Nazi, who held anti-Nazi views, and refused to wear German decorations, when in uniform. Bailovic was also a Turkish interpreter and spent significant time in evaluation, providing intelligence.

Military career
Bailovic was a colonel in the Austro-Hungarian Army, who served as an officer in Trieste and was director of the Austrian cipher bureau during World War I. He was considered a middle ranking official of the Austrian cipher section, by Fenner, before and during World War II. During the Anschluss, Bailovic refused to surrender the keys of his department to the Nazis when Austria was subsumed. Subsequently, he was relegated to a minor position in the Austrian civil service.  General Erich Fellgiebel and Fritz Thiele, recognising his potential, ordered Wilhelm Fenner to Vienna, to bring Bailovic, along with seven of his colleagues back to Germany, to be employed as cryptanalysts and evaluators. In the final tally, only 4 people came back with Bailovic, that included Joseph Seifert, the then current director of the Austrian cipher bureau. Upon their landing in Germany, a Forschungsamt official met the party at the airport where the Forschungsamt (abbr. FA) official offered money to Bailovic to work for them, which Fenner found disturbing.

Bailovic initially worked for the FA, which was the Luftwaffe's chief Hermann Göring private cipher bureau, specifically for the Nazi Party. Bailovic worked at the FA unit for several months, when he left unexpectedly and was known to be employed by Inspectorate 7/VI by Autumn 1941, when he ran the Balkan desk. During this period, the results from solving both codes and cyphers in the Balkan section were generally forwarded to KONA 4, the Signals unit assigned to the Balkans theatre.

For much of his working life in Inspectorate 7/VI, Bailovic ran the informal Bailovic Party, that was an anti-nazi clique. After the 20 July plot, the Nazi, Grupperleiter Major Lechner was appointed to replace Major Mettig as commander of In 7/VI. The Bailovic Party held the most able personnel and was highly regarded, but dwindling Balkan traffic meant the unit became superfluous, and lost most of the prestige and power. With a new Nazi leader in Major Lechner, the group was disbanded. Bailovic was removed from the unit, along with several others, with Lechner being posted to the west to become commander of KONA 6.

In October 1944, Bailovic was appointed to the OKW/Chi in the position as head of the desk dealing specifically with Balkan traffic. Towards the end of the war, he became an administrator, after the Balkans were invaded as Balkan message traffic dwindled and became progressively rarer, as the war reached its conclusion.

References

1885 births
Pre-computer cryptographers
German cryptographers
History of cryptography
Year of death missing
Austro-Hungarian military personnel